KIQX (101.3 FM) is a radio station  broadcasting a hot adult contemporary/Variety format which includes adult alternative, classic rock and Rhythm & Blues. Licensed to Durango, Colorado, United States, the station serves the Four Corners area. The station is currently owned by Four Corners Broadcasting, LLC and features programming from CBS News Radio.

Personalities
Ed Lacy in the Morning
Brett Lustig in the Afternoon

References

External links
Official Website

Hot adult contemporary radio stations in the United States
IQX